Mexborough railway station serves the former mining town of Mexborough, South Yorkshire, England.

As the original station at Mexborough Junction did not serve the line to Rotherham and Sheffield when this opened it was replaced by a new station built immediately on the Doncaster side of the junction. The new station was approximately halfway between Mexborough Junction and Mexborough (Ferry Boat) Halt and was able to serve the town centre at the top of Station Road.

It was on 1 June 1874 that the third side of the triangle (Mexborough Reverse Curve) was put in place which allowed trains to work from the Sheffield line to Barnsley without need of reversal. This was closed on 5 September 1966.

The Barnsley to Doncaster local passenger services were withdrawn on 29 June 1959 and further changes in the area took place with the opening of Aldwarke Junction in 1966.  From this date all passenger trains to Sheffield were routed to Sheffield Midland: at first via the Swinton curve, until its closure in January 1968, and thereafter via the Great Central route through the closed Kilnhurst Central.  Nowadays trains mostly operate via the re-instated Swinton curve to the new Swinton (a few passenger trains still use the old GCR line for operational reasons).

Mexborough once had a third platform which, in effect, made the Sheffield-bound platform an "island".  This was used occasionally for regular passenger services travelling via the Great Central line to Sheffield but more often by excursion trains to East Coast resorts such as Scarborough, Bridlington and Cleethorpes. This platform face ceased to be used in the late 1970s but can still be seen.

As part of the South Yorkshire Passenger Transport Executive's 4-year plan for upgrading the railways in the county, Mexborough received an upgraded waiting area and ticket office which were completed in May 1989.

In 2009/2010, Mexborough was further improved by help points, an updated PA system, refurbished toilets and booking office area, additional shelters and CCTV, information screens and improved access for the disabled.

In 2011 Mexborough won the category 'Station of the Year (Small)' at the National Rail Awards.

Facilities
The station's booking office is staffed each day on a part-time basis (06:00-19:00 Monday to Saturday, 08:00-15:00 Sundays).  Outside these times, tickets must be bought on the train or in advance or at the two ticket machines, one on each platform & card payment only.  There are waiting rooms and customer help points on both platforms.  Digital display screens, timetable posters and automated train announcements offer train running information and there is step-free access to both platforms.

Service
Monday to Saturday services consist of two westbound services per hour: both of which terminate at Sheffield. The two eastbound services travel run to Doncaster, with alternate services through to Adwick. On Sundays there is an hourly service to Sheffield and to Doncaster.

Services are generally formed of Class 150 and Class 158 with occasional Class 195's on a weekday morning also appearing on certain services.

After the May 2018 timetable change, Mexborough no longer has direct trains to Scunthorpe or Lincoln, and the two TransPennine Express services that previously called here now pass through non-stop. Regular through trains to Hull have also now ceased (from December 2019), with passengers having to change at Doncaster for onward connections.

See also
Listed buildings in Conisbrough and Denaby

References

External links 

Mexborough
Railway stations in Doncaster
DfT Category D stations
Former South Yorkshire Railway stations
Railway stations in Great Britain opened in 1871
Northern franchise railway stations